The discography of American rapper Big Boi consists of three studio albums, one mixtape, twenty-two singles, five promotional singles and twenty-five music videos. Big Boi initially achieved success as a member of the hip hop duo Outkast with fellow rapper André 3000; they have recorded and released six studio albums together, and the singles "Ms. Jackson", "Hey Ya!" (performed solely by 3000) and "The Way You Move" (performed solely by Big Boi) have all topped the US Billboard Hot 100. In 1995, Big Boi made a guest appearance on the single "Dirty South" by American hip hop group Goodie Mob, which peaked at number 92 on the Billboard Hot 100. During the late 1990s and early 2000s, he made several other appearances on commercially successful singles, including "All n My Grill" by rapper Missy Elliott, "A.D.I.D.A.S." by rapper Killer Mike and "Girlfight" by singer Brooke Valentine; these songs charted on the Billboard Hot 100.

Big Boi released his first two solo singles – "Royal Flush" and "Sumthin's Gotta Give" – in 2008, with "Ringtone" following in 2009. All three songs were recorded for his purported debut studio album Sir Lucious Left Foot: The Son of Chico Dusty: however, due to legal complications resulting from Big Boi's departure from his former record label Jive Records, the album's release was considerably delayed and was not released until 2010. The eventual first single from Sir Lucious Left Foot: The Son of Chico Dusty, titled "Shutterbugg", peaked at number 60 on the US Hot R&B/Hip-Hop Songs chart, as well as number 32 on the UK Singles Chart and number 13 on the UK R&B Chart. The album spawned the single "Follow Us", a collaboration with rock group Vonnegutt. Following its eventual release, Sir Lucious Left Foot: The Son of Chico Dusty debuted at number 3 on the US Billboard 200, and appeared on several other national album charts. Big Boi's second studio album, Vicious Lies and Dangerous Rumors, was released on December 11, 2012 in the United States, and peaked at number 34 on the Billboard 200 in the first week following its release. The album was preceded by the release of the singles "Gossip", "She Said OK" and "Mama Told Me".

Albums

Studio albums

Mixtapes

Collaborative albums

Singles

As lead artist

As featured artist

Promotional singles

Other charted songs

Guest appearances

Solo production discography
Note: Andre also helped produce several songs on OutKast's albums with partner Big Boi, usually credited as just OutKast or as their production alias Earthtone III.

2003
Killer Mike - Monster
01. "A.D.I.D.A.S. 
Outkast - Speakerboxxx/The Love Below
03. "The Way You Move"

2004
Nelly - Suit
05. "She Don't Know My Name"

2005
Santana - All That I Am
04. "My Man" 
Killer Mike - Non-album single
00. "My Chrome" 
Jennifer Lopez - Rebirth
07. "Still Around"

2006
Bubba Sparxxx - The Charm
07. "Ain't Life Grand"
Diddy - Press Play
08. "Wanna Move" 
Outkast - Idlewild
09. "The Train"
14. "Call the Law" 
Chapter 4 - Sampler
03. "Should've Thought Twice"

2010
Big Boi - Sir Lucious Left Foot: The Son of Chico Dusty
05. "Shutterbugg" 
06. "General Patton"
07. "Tangerine"
11. "Fo Yo Sorrows"
12. "Night Night"
13. "Shine Blockas"
15. "Back Up Plan"

2012
Big Boi - Vicious Lies and Dangerous Rumors
02. "The Thickets"
08. "Thom Pettie"
09. "Mama Told Me"

Music videos

As lead artist

As featured artist

See also 
 Purple Ribbon All-Stars discography
 Outkast discography

Notes 

A  "Ringtone" did not enter the Hot R&B/Hip-Hop Songs chart, but peaked at number 5 on the Bubbling Under R&B/Hip-Hop Singles chart, which acts as an extension to the Hot R&B/Hip-Hop Songs chart.
B  "Shutterbugg" did not enter the Billboard Hot 100, but peaked at number 20 on the Bubbling Under Hot 100 Singles chart, which acts as an extension to the Hot 100.
C  "Follow Us" did not enter the Hot R&B/Hip-Hop Songs chart, but peaked at number 19 on the Bubbling Under R&B/Hip-Hop Singles chart, which acts as an extension to the Hot R&B/Hip-Hop Songs chart.
D  Two single versions of "All n My Grill" were released: the first features MC Solaar, and the second features Big Boi.
E  "Hood Boy" did not enter the Billboard Hot 100, but peaked at number 3 on the Bubbling Under Hot 100 Singles chart, which acts as an extension to the Hot 100.
F  "Shine Blockas" did not enter the Hot R&B/Hip-Hop Songs chart, but peaked at number 23 on the Bubbling Under R&B/Hip-Hop Singles chart, which acts as an extension to the Hot R&B/Hip-Hop Songs chart.

References

External links
 Official website
 Big Boi at AllMusic
 
 

Discographies of American artists
Hip hop discographies